Thermal resistance is a heat property and a measurement of a temperature difference by which an object or material resists a heat flow. Thermal resistance is the reciprocal of thermal conductance.

 (Absolute) thermal resistance R in kelvins per watt (K/W) is a property of a particular component. For example, a characteristic of a heat sink.
 Specific thermal resistance or thermal resistivity Rλ in kelvin–metres per watt (K⋅m/W), is a material constant.
 Thermal insulance has the units square metre kelvin per watt (m2⋅K/W) in SI units or square foot degree Fahrenheit–hours per British thermal unit (ft2⋅°F⋅h/Btu) in imperial units. It is the thermal resistance of unit area of a material. In terms of insulation, it is measured by the R-value.

Absolute thermal resistance 
Absolute thermal resistance is the temperature difference across a structure when a unit of heat energy flows through it in unit time.  It is the reciprocal of thermal conductance. The SI unit of absolute thermal resistance is kelvins per watt (K/W) or the equivalent degrees Celsius per watt (°C/W) – the two are the same since the intervals are equal: ΔT = 1 K = 1 °C.

The thermal resistance of materials is of great interest to electronic engineers because most electrical components generate heat and need to be cooled. Electronic components malfunction or fail if they overheat, and some parts routinely need measures taken in the design stage to prevent this.

Analogies and nomenclature 

Electrical engineers are familiar with Ohm's law and so often use it as an analogy when doing calculations involving thermal resistance. Mechanical and structural engineers are more familiar with Hooke's law and so often use it as an analogy when doing calculations involving thermal resistance.

Explanation from an electronics point of view

Equivalent thermal circuits 

The heat flow can be modelled by analogy to an electrical circuit where heat flow is represented by current, temperatures are represented by voltages, heat sources are represented by constant current sources, absolute thermal resistances are represented by resistors and thermal capacitances by capacitors.

The diagram shows an equivalent thermal circuit for a semiconductor device with a heat sink.

Example calculation

Derived from Fourier's law for heat conduction

From Fourier's Law for heat conduction, the following equation can be derived, and is valid as long as all of the parameters (x and k) are constant throughout the sample.

 

where:
  is the absolute thermal resistance (K/W) across the thickness of the sample
  is the thickness (m) of the sample (measured on a path parallel to the heat flow) 
  is the thermal conductivity (W/(K·m)) of the sample 
  is the thermal resistivity (K·m/W) of the sample 
  is the cross-sectional area (m2) perpendicular to the path of heat flow.

In terms of the temperature gradient across the sample and heat flux through the sample, the relationship is:

 

where:
  is the absolute thermal resistance (K/W) across the thickness of the sample,
  is the thickness (m) of the sample (measured on a path parallel to the heat flow),
  is the heat flux through the sample (W·m−2),
  is the temperature gradient (K·m−1) across the sample,
  is the cross-sectional area (m2) perpendicular to the path of heat flow through the sample,
  is the temperature difference (K) across the sample,
  is the rate of heat flow (W) through the sample.

Problems with electrical resistance analogy 
A 2008 review paper written by Philips researcher Clemens J. M. Lasance notes that: "Although there is an analogy between heat flow by conduction (Fourier's law) and the flow of an electric current (Ohm’s law), the corresponding physical properties of thermal conductivity and electrical conductivity conspire to make the behavior of heat flow quite unlike the flow of electricity in normal situations. [...] Unfortunately, although the electrical and thermal differential equations are analogous, it is erroneous to conclude that there is any practical analogy between electrical and thermal resistance. This is because a material that is considered an insulator in electrical terms is about 20 orders of magnitude less conductive than a material that is considered a conductor, while, in thermal terms, the difference between an "insulator" and a "conductor" is only about three orders of magnitude. The entire range of thermal conductivity is then equivalent to the difference in electrical conductivity of high-doped and low-doped silicon."

Measurement standards 

The junction-to-air thermal resistance can vary greatly depending on the ambient conditions. (A more sophisticated way of expressing the same fact is saying that junction-to-ambient thermal resistance is not Boundary-Condition Independent (BCI).) JEDEC has a standard (number JESD51-2) for measuring the junction-to-air thermal resistance of electronics packages under natural convection and another standard (number JESD51-6) for measurement under forced convection.

A JEDEC standard for measuring the junction-to-board thermal resistance (relevant for surface-mount technology) has been published as JESD51-8.

A JEDEC standard for measuring the junction-to-case thermal resistance (JESD51-14) is relatively newcomer, having been published in late 2010; it concerns only packages having a single heat flow and an exposed cooling surface.

Resistance in composite wall

Resistances in series
When resistances are in series, the total resistance is the sum of the resistances:

Parallel thermal resistance

Similarly to electrical circuits, the total thermal resistance for steady state conditions can be calculated as follows.

The total thermal resistance

           (1)

Simplifying the equation, we get

           (2)
With terms for the thermal resistance for conduction, we get

           (3)

Resistance in series and parallel

It is often suitable to assume one-dimensional conditions, although the heat flow is multidimensional. Now, two different circuits may be used for this case. For case (a) (shown in picture), we presume isothermal surfaces for those normal to the x- direction, whereas for case (b) we presume adiabatic surfaces parallel to the x- direction. When the multidimensional effects becomes more significant, these differences are increased with increasing .

Radial systems 
Spherical and cylindrical systems may be treated as one-dimensional, due to the temperature gradients in the radial direction. The standard method can be used for analyzing radial systems under steady state conditions, starting with the appropriate form of the heat equation, or the alternative method, starting with the appropriate form of Fourier's law. For a hollow cylinder in steady state conditions with no heat generation, the appropriate form of heat equation is 
           (4)

Where  is treated as a variable. Considering the appropriate form of Fourier's law, the physical significance of treating  as a variable becomes evident when the rate at which energy is conducted across a cylindrical surface, this is represented as

           (5)

Where  is the area that is normal to the direction of where the heat transfer occurs. Equation 1 implies that the quantity  is not dependent of the radius , it follows from equation 5 that the heat transfer rate,  is a constant in the radial direction.

In order to determine the temperature distribution in the cylinder, equation 4 can be solved applying the appropriate boundary conditions. With the assumption that  is constant

           (6)
Using the following boundary conditions, the constants  and  can be computed
           and          

The general solution gives us

           and          
           (7)

The logarithmic distribution of the temperature is sketched in the inset of the thumbnail figure.
Assuming that the temperature distribution, equation 7, is used with Fourier's law in equation 5, the heat transfer rate can be expressed in the following form

 

Finally, for radial conduction in a cylindrical wall, the thermal resistance is of the form
  such that

See also 
 Thermal engineering
 Thermal design power
 Safe operating area

References 
10. K Einalipour, S. Sadeghzadeh, F. Molaei. “Interfacial thermal resistance engineering for polyaniline (C3N)-graphene heterostructure”, The Journal of Physical Chemistry, 2020. DOI:10.1021/acs.jpcc.0c02051
Michael Lenz, Günther Striedl, Ulrich Fröhler (January 2000) Thermal Resistance, Theory and Practice. Infineon Technologies AG, Munich, Germany.
Directed Energy, Inc./IXYSRF (March 31, 2003)  R Theta And Power Dissipation Technical Note. Ixys RF, Fort Collins, Colorado. Example thermal resistance and power dissipation calculation in semiconductors.

Further reading 
There is a large amount of literature on this topic. In general, works using the term "thermal resistance" are more engineering-oriented, whereas works using the term thermal conductivity are more [pure-]physics-oriented. The following books are representative, but may be easily substituted.

External links 
 Guoping Xu (2006), Thermal Management for Electronic Packaging, Sun Microsystems
 http://www.electronics-cooling.com/2012/09/update-on-jedec-thermal-standards/
The importance of Soil Thermal Resistivity for power companies

Heat conduction
Electronic engineering